The 1892 Cincinnati football team was an American football team that represented the University of Cincinnati as an independent during the 1892 college football season. The team compiled a 1–2 record. Dan Laurence and James Robinson were the team captains. The team had no head coach and played its home games at Union Ball Park in Cincinnati.

Schedule

References

Cincinnati
Cincinnati Bearcats football seasons
Cincinnati football